Håkansson, Hakansson, Håkanson or Hakanson is a Swedish surname that may refer to

Anders Håkansson (born 1956), retired professional ice hockey player
Ane Håkansson Hansen (born 1975), internationally elite curler from Denmark
Daniel Håkansson of the Diablo Swing Orchestra, a Swedish avant-garde metal band formed in 2003
Erik Hakansson or Eric of Norway (960s – 1020s), earl of Lade, ruler of Norway and earl of Northumbria
Eva-Marie Håkansson (born 1960), former Swedish Olympic swimmer
Fredrik Håkansson (born 1975), Swedish table tennis international
Gabriella Håkansson, (born 1968), Swedish novelist
Gustaf Håkansson, (1885–1987), famous as the "Super Grandpa" after cycling the Sverigeloppet at 66 years of age
Hakan Hakansson of Norway (1204–1263), the King of Norway from 1217 to 1263
Håkan Håkansson (born 1947), Swedish organizational theorist
Hans Håkansson (1908–1993), Swedish footballer
Ingvar Fredrik Håkansson, World War II pilot
Jesper Håkansson (born 1981), Danish footballer
Johan Håkansson (died 1432), Archbishop of Uppsala, Sweden, 1421–1432
Jonas Håkansson (born 1974), Swedish ice hockey player
Kenny Håkansson, the bassist of the Swedish rock & roll band the Hellacopters
Kiki Håkansson (born 1929), the winner of the first Miss World beauty pageant in 1951
Lars-Erik Håkansson (born 1950), Swedish curler
Ludvig Håkanson (born 1996), Latvian basketball player
Mattias Håkansson (born 1993), Swedish footballer
Mikael Håkanson (born 1974), Swedish ice hockey player
Nils Håkansson, late medieval Swedish painter from Vadstena, known for his wall paintings
Ola Håkansson (born 1945), Swedish singer, composer and producer
Olle Håkansson (born 1927), Swedish football midfielder
Olle Håkansson (curler) (born 1956), Swedish curler
Patric Håkansson (Patric Klaremo) (born 1977)< Swedish curler and coach
Per-Arne Håkansson (born 1963), Swedish politician
Stig Håkansson (1918–2000), Swedish sprinter, long jumper and curler
Sven Håkansson (1909–1997), Swedish long-distance runner who competed in the 1948 Summer Olympics
Ulla Håkansson (born 1937), Swedish equestrian and Olympic medalist

Swedish-language surnames
Patronymic surnames
Surnames from given names